The music in the Civilization video game series has been composed by various composers.

Civilization
The soundtrack of the original Civilization game was available in either digital MIDI format for DOS version, or in tracker format for Amiga version. Most of original tunes were composed by Jeff Briggs, while others were taken from traditional or classic compositions, referring to each national culture (civilization) represented in the game. The same music used for the Aztecs was also applied to the Barbarians whenever they invaded a city.

Romans – "Rise of Rome" (original)
Babylonians – "Hammurabi's Code" (original)
Germans – DOS version: "Variatio 4: Lo stesso movimento" from Goldberg Variations (Johann Sebastian Bach); Amiga version: "Rondo alla Turca" (Wolfgang Amadeus Mozart)
Egyptians – "Harvest Of the Nile" (original)
Americans – "Battle Hymn of the Republic"
Greek – "Aristotle's Pupil" (original)
Mongols – "Mongol Horde" (original)
Russians – "Song of the Volga Boatmen" (traditional)
Zulus – (original)
French – "La Marseillaise"
Aztecs – "Tenochtitlan Revealed" (original)
Chinese – "The Shining Path" (traditional)
English – "Rondeau" from Symphonies and Fanfares for the King's Supper (Jean-Joseph Mouret)
Indians – "Gautama Ponders" (original)

Besides the main theme, sometimes known as "Civilization Opening Theme", other tunes used in the game were Ode to Joy from Beethoven's Ninth Symphony in the "leader's day" celebration in cities, as well as the Funeral March from Beethoven's Third Symphony.

Civilization II

Civilization IIs music is in the Red Book CD-audio format, the same as that found on normal music CDs. The songs are quite varied; some are from the 19th century classical era, such as the Blue Danube Waltz, while others have a tribal, tropical sound to them. The music can be played back through any CD-ROM drive. Over 200 MB of space on the Civilization II CD is taken up by the music, 280 MB is occupied by the videos (many of them are historical footages), whereas the actual program data takes up less than 30 MB.

The five different releases of Civilization II have added and subtracted tracks from the mix, with Fantastic Worlds containing the largest number of tracks of all releases.

Wonders of the World Music

Whenever a player builds a Wonder of the World, a short video with music is played. The music is often taken from other sources:

 King Richard's Crusade – Dance of the Furies, Christoph Willibald Gluck
 Leonardo's Workshop – Cantaloupe Island, Herbie Hancock
 Michelangelo's Chapel – Credo from Missa Papae Marcelli, Giovanni Pierluigi da Palestrina
 J.S. Bach's Cathedral – Toccata and Fugue in D minor, Johann Sebastian Bach
 Shakespeare's Theatre – taken from the prologue to Henry V
 Statue of Liberty – El Capitan March, John Philip Sousa
 Isaac Newton's College – Concerto For 4 Violins & Strings in B minor, Antonio Vivaldi
 Adam Smith's Trading Company – The Entrance of the Queen of Sheba from the oratorio Solomon, George Frideric Handel

Most videos, however, feature original compositions with often discernible inspiration, either from Peter Gabriel's soundtrack to The Last Temptation of Christ:

 Pyramids – "The Feeling Begins"
 Great Wall of China – "Gethsemane"
 Sun Tzu's War Academy – "Gethsemane"

Trevor Jones' and Randy Edelman's soundtrack to The Last of the Mohicans (1992):

 Colossus – main title
 Great Lighthouse – "Elk Hunt"
 Marco Polo's Embassy – "Promontory"
 Magellan's Expedition – "Fort Battle"
 United Nations – "The Glade"

Or various other sources:

 Oracle – Theme from Harry's Game by Clannad
 Women's Suffrage – Swinging at the Daisy Chain by the Count Basie Orchestra
 Hoover Dam – a remix version of "Arkham Bridge" from the soundtrack of the PC game Mechwarrior 2 Ghost Bears Legacy by Gregory Alper & Jeehun Hwang.
 Manhattan Project – I Had My Chance by Morphine
 Apollo Program – Telegraph Road by Dire Straits

Civilization III
Civilization III is a 2001 strategy game from Firaxis Games. As the game progresses, the music changes to reflect the era. There are five different mixes that represent the five major cultural groupings of the Civs in the game (European, North American, Middle Eastern, Greco-Roman, and Asian).

During diplomatic negotiations with leaders of other civilizations, there are both aggressive and passive tracks for each culture grouping that play depending on the mood of the civilization the player negotiates with. All the music in the game is stored in MP3 format.

Roger Briggs and Mark Cromer are credited with the game's music.

Civilization IV

The music of the computer game Civilization IV features a large variety of tracks both original and historical, from Gregorian chants to modern minimalism, and makes extensive use of classical music as well as both world music and folk music. Such a focus on the soundtrack and the inclusion of classical, world and folk music are rare among games, though relatively common for strategy games. Original music was created for the expansion Civilization IV: Warlords and includes specifically themed music for each of the several scenarios, and several new Leader pieces. Civilization IV: Warlords  also uses music from Civilization III to fill out some of the areas overlooked in the original Civilization IV, such as music for the "classical" period, and adds eastern music for the Asian scenarios. All tracks are stored on the hard drive in mp3 format, making them perfectly usable outside the game.

Overview

Original music was composed by Jeff Briggs, Mark Cromer, Michael Curran, and Christopher Tin. Featured composers include John Adams, Gregorio Allegri, Johann Sebastian Bach, Ludwig van Beethoven, Johannes Brahms, Antoine Brumel, Giovanni Pierluigi da Palestrina, Francisco de la Torre, Josquin des Prez, Antonín Dvořák, Orlande de Lassus, Wolfgang Amadeus Mozart, Johannes Ockeghem, Michael Praetorius, Nikolai Rimsky-Korsakov, Camille Saint-Saëns and John Sheppard.

Each of the game's time periods has its own set of background music appropriate for the period. The Ancient and Classical ages are limited to four original tracks that mostly focus on ambience and primitive instruments such as drums and the flute. The Middle Ages feature medieval and renaissance music, both instrumental and chants, such as Kyrie by Ockeghem. The renaissance era uses baroque and classical music by Mozart, Beethoven and Bach. The soundtrack to the industrial period focuses on romantic music by Brahms, Dvořák and Beethoven, with one track each from Saint-Saëns and Rimsky-Korsakov. The modern age's music is composed exclusively of music by American minimalist composer John Adams. Orchestral samples in the game are from the Vienna Symphonic Library, which features recordings of classical music by members of the Vienna Philharmonic.

Each leader has his or her own theme music as well, and each leitmotif has three variants, corresponding to different periods in the game. These are shorter and simpler pieces, from just under 40 seconds to three minutes. Each reflects the leader or country in question: Roosevelt's music is the Marines' Hymn, and Napoleon's is based on La Marseillaise. Some are renditions of famous pieces of classical music, such as Frederick's piece, which is a paraphrase of the fourth of the Goldberg Variations, or Bismarck's, which is the opening theme of the second movement of Beethoven's Symphony No. 3. Others, such as Mao Zedong and Alexander the Great have music that has been modified from earlier games, such as Civilization III.

The theme song is "Coronation" composed by Christopher Tin, and the main menu music is "Baba Yetu", also composed by him. The latter features lyrics based on a Swahili adaptation of the Lord's Prayer by Chris Kiagiri. Vocals were performed by Stanford Talisman.

Music

Stanford Talisman performs all the pieces written by Christopher Tin. The other tracks (especially the polyphony from the Medieval section) are performed by a variety of groups, who are not credited on the original soundtrack.

Civilization V
The soundtrack of Civilization V contains many hours of licensed music as well as an original score of primarily leader music written by Geoff Knorr and Michael Curran. The original score features new compositions as well as folk songs and famous compositions. Some of the songs in the game were released as a 2-disc soundtrack as part of the Deluxe Edition. 
The track listing of the soundtrack is:

However, some leader themes, city state themes, and the ambient music are omitted from the soundtrack.

Also omitted from the music credits are Gabriel Fauré's Berceuse, the Berceuse from his Dolly Suite, and his Sicilienne.

Licensed music
The full list of licensed music is as follows:

12/20/82 SONG Performed by R. Carlos Nakai
AIR AND OTHER INVISIBLE FORCES Performed by Michael Askill
AL KHAYAM Performed by Bashir Abdel Al 
AMAN Performed by Michael Askill & Omar Faruk Tekbilek
ARIA OF SNOW Performed by China Broadcasting Chinese Orchestra
ARIDDA WAL NOOR Performed by Bashir Abdel Al
ATUM III Performed by Michael Atherton 
ATUM V Performed by Michael Atherton 
AUTUMN FANTASY Performed by Nanae Yoshimura
BALLATA SINFONICA (II) Written by Akira Ifukube
BLACKFOOT NIGHTS, Courtesy of Global Journey Ltd. 2010
BRIDE MEETING TUNE OF BOLU Performed by Hüseyin Türkmenler
BROTHER HUNTER Performed by Dijvan Gasparian
CANYON REVERIE Performed by R. Carlos Nakai
CATFISH MUSE Written by R. Carlos Nakai,
CHEYENNE PRAIRIE, Courtesy of Global Journey Ltd. 2010
CHOS, Courtesy of Lyrichord, Courtesy of Naxos of America, Inc.
COLORFUL CLOUDS CHASING THE MOON Performed by China Broadcasting Chinese Orchestra, Written by Ren Guang
CONCERTO FOR SITAR & ORCHESTRA - FOURTH MOVEMENT: RAGA MANJ KHAMAJ, Written by Ravi Shankar
CONCERTO FOR SITAR & ORCHESTRA - SECOND MOVEMENT: RAGA SINDHI BHAIRAVI Written by Ravi Shankar
CONCERTO TURCO NOMINATO Written by Giambattista Toderini
COOL WATER Written and Performed by Michael Askill & Omar Faruk Tekbilek
CRESCENT MOON Written and Performed by Omar Faruk Tekbilek
DAYBREAK VISION Written and Performed by R. Carlos Nakai
DESERT WIND Written and Performed by Michael Askill & Omar Faruk Tekbilek
DREAM OF THE NAVAJO, Courtesy of Global Journey Ltd. 2010
EGDONHEATH Written by Gustav Holst
ETENRAKU NOKORIGAKU SANBEN Performed by Tokyo Gakuso
FANTASIA A 3 NO. 6 Written by Gibbons, Orlando
FAR FROM THE WATER Written by James DeMars
FETE-DIEU A SEVILLE Written by Isaac Albeniz
FLYING BIRD Performed by Bashir Abdel Al
GAWAZI Written and Performed by Omar Faruk Tekbilek
GHIZEMLI Performed by Omar Faruk Tekbilek
THE GOLDSMITHS Written and Performed by Michael Askill & Omar Faruk Tekbilek
HAMMERSMITH Written by Gustav Holst
HARU-ICHIBAN PT.1 Written and Performed by Joji Hirota
HARVEST Written and Performed by Joji Hirota
INNER VOICES Written and Performed by R. Carlos Nakai
I. NOCTURNE Written by Akira Ifukube
IN THE MANGER Written by Ippolitov-Ivanov, Mikhail Mikhaylovich
İSTANBUL'DAN GÖRÜNTÜLER Performed by Brian Keane & Omar Faruk Tekbilek
ITSUTSU NO SHOHIN: NISHIKIGI NI YOSETE (FIVE SKETCHES: ON NISHIKIGI), AIDAMA: INDIGO BALL Performed by Nanae Yoshimura 
ITSUTSU NO SHOHIN: NISHIKIGI NI YOSETE (FIVE SKETCHES: ON NISHIKIGI), MOEGI: YELLOWISH GREEN Performed by Nanae Yoshimura 
ITSUTSU NO SHOHIN: NISHIKIGI NI YOSETE (FIVE SKETCHES: ON NISHIKIGI), RURI: LAPIS LAZULI Performed by Nanae Yoshimura 
JACH'S MARKA, Traditional, Courtesy of Fortuna Records
JOYFUL NIGHT Performed by China Broadcasting Chinese Orchestra
KANGEN: HYOJO NO NETORI Performed by Tokyo Gakuso
KHET Performed by Michael Atherton 
KOKOPELLI WIND Written and Performed by R. Carlos Nakai
LA FILLE AUX Written by Claude Debussy
MAAT Written and Performed by Michael Atherton 
MARCH OF THE BEY'S, Anonymous, Courtesy of Hungaton
MATSURA PART 1 Written by Yuzo Toyama
MATSURA PART 2 Written by Yuzo Toyama 
MIYAJIMA Performed by Synergy
MORNING LOVE (BASED ON RAGA NATA-BHAIRAVI) Written and Performed by Ravi Shankar
A MOUNTAIN VILLAGE IN A SPRING MORNING Performed by China Broadcasting Chinese Orchestra
MUSASHI MAI UCHI Performed by Joji Hirota
NARA Written and Performed by Charbel Rouhana
NAY SOLO Performed by Mohammed Foda
NORTHERN FOREST Performed by China Broadcasting Chinese Orchestra
OUR TOWN Performed by Leonard Slatkin and the Saint Louis Symphony Orchestra, Written by Aaron Copland
PAGEANT Written and Performed by Joji Hirota
PAISAJE MEXICANO from The Latin American Sketches, Written by Aaron Copland
PAKISTANI SUFI RHYTHM Composed and Performed R A Fish
PANIS ANGELICUS Written by Cesar Franck
PESREVIN RASTMODE Written by Dimitrie Cantemir
RAGA MALA - GARLAND OF RAGAS (SITAR CONCERTO NO. 2) - II. BAIRAGI (MODERATO) Written by Ravi Shankar
RAGA MALA - GARLAND OF RAGAS (SITAR CONCERTO NO. 2) - III. YAMAN KALYAN (MODERATO) Written by Ravi Shankar
RAQSAT ALBEDOI Performed by Ahmed Mukhtar
THE RED PONY Written by Aaron Copland
REWIND Written and Performed by Charbel Rouhana
SALOME'S ENTRANCE Written and Performed by Michael Askill
SALUTE TO THE SUN Performed by Omar Faruk Tekbilek
SENBURGAZ CIFTETELLISI Performed by Ahmet Kusgöz Ve Arkadaslari
SEOTO Performed by Nanae Yoshimura
SETT NO.1 FANTASIA Written by William Lawes
SHEN Written and Performed by Michael Atherton 
SHINRABANSYO Courtesy of Black Sun Records
SOLO FOR THE UD, Courtesy of Hungaton
SONG FOR THE MORNING STAR Written by R. Carlos Nakai
SUITE NO.5 IN C M Written by Johann Mattheson
SUFI HOUSE Written and Performed by Michael Askill & Omar Faruk Tekbilek
SUFI MOMENTS Written and Performed by Ahmed Mukhtar
SULTAN OF THE HEARTS Written and Performed by Omar Faruk Tekbilek
TAKEDA'S POEM Performed by Synergy
THE TENDER LAND Written by Aaron Copland
UNDER DESERT STARS Written and Performed by Michael Askill & Omar Faruk Tekbilek
WHEN I AM LAID IN EARTH Written by Henry Purcell
WHIRLING DERVISH RHYTHM Composed and Performed by R A Fish
WINTER SOLSTICE Written and Performed by R. Carlos Nakai
WISSAL Written and Performed by Charbel Rouhana
WOODSONG C Written by R. Carlos Nakai, arrangement by Billy Williams
YALEL Written and Performed by Omar Faruk Tekbilek
YUNUS Written and Performed by Omar Faruk Tekbilek

APM Music, LLC
The following tracks are courtesy of APM Music, LLC:

ANCIENT FORCES
ANGEL OR DEVIL
ANGKOR
APOCALYPSE WARRIOR
ARABIA C
BAD TURBULENCE
BIOGENESIS
BLOOMING
BRIGHT COLOURS
CARAJAS
COLD AND MASSIVE
COLD FLOATING
COLD MENACE
COLD WAITING
DAMAGED LANDS
DARK LANDSCAPES
DARK VOYAGE
DARK CURRENTS
DISTURBING FUSION
DRAGON DANCE
DYNASTIES OF POWER
THE DYNASTY BEGINS
ELLIPSE
THE ENLIGHTENED ONE
THE ETERNAL QUESTION A
FEARFUL STEPS
THE FINAL COMBAT
FLAME TREE
THE FLOATING TEMPLE
FLOATING TEXTURE
FLOWER ELEGY
FRAGILE LANDS
FUTURE VICTORY
GOLDEN TEMPLE
GONE
GREAT WALL OF CHINA
HEAVY GURGLING
HIDDEN FORCES
HIGHLANDS OF TIBET
HOLY WATER VESSEL
HONOURED WAYS
INDIAN
INDIAN BRAVE
INFANT EMPEROR
IRIRI
JURUA
KAMBU
KAPMAI
LANTERN GARDEN
THE LAST HERO
LAST INVASION
LIGHT WAVE
LITTLE SUSPENSE
LIVES AND SECRETS
LOST TO THE WORLD 1
LOST EMPEROR
LUXURIANT TORPOR
MANITOU
MAN OF SORROW
MARAJO
MINIATURE
MOTHER GANGES
NANG NAHK
NERVOUS TREMORS
NO RESTING PLACE
OF ANCIENT WALLS
OLD WOMAN'S LAMENT
PANIC FEAR
PERSISTING WRIGGLING
PHATCHA
PRIMITIVE MARCH
PUTUMAYO
QUEST FOR PEACE
QUIET COURAGE
RABUM NOKYOUNG
RESTLESS SLEEP
ROLLING TONE
SAHARAN VISTAS
SAI TAR SINLAPIN
SECLUSION
THE SENSES AWAKEN
SHADOW
SIGNS OF LIFE
SLOW FALL
SOLO FLUTE 2
SONG OF THE IMPERIAL THRONE
SONG OF THE PLAINS
STIRRING
SUKHOTHAI
SUNSET JOURNEY
TAJ MAHAL AGRA, INDIA A
TERRE VIBRANTE
THAR DESERT
THREE GREAT RIVERS
TIDE OF DESTRUCTION
TO DISCOVER
TRAGIC ACTION
TRIBAL BREATH
TRIBAL TENSION
TROMBETAS
UNSTABLE
URUCU
VI DAM
VILLAGE MORNING
VOICES OF WAR
WHERE EAGLES FLY
WHERE AND WHY
WILD FORCE
WINDSONG1
WINDSONG4
WINDSONG5
WINDSONG8
A WILD BEAUTY (A)
A WILD BEAUTY (B)
XINGU

Dewolfe Music
The following are courtesy of Dewolfe Music:

ADAGIO MONOCHORD
AMARYLLIS SUITE Composed by George Frideric Handel
AMARYLLIS SUITE SARABANDE Composed by George Frideric Handel
AMERICAN DREAMS Composed by Frédéric Talgorn
AT REST
A WINTERS TALE
CARMEN SUITE PRELUDE Composed by Georges Bizet
CHANSON Composed by Simon Park
DUSK
ELEGY
EPITAPH
FIELD OF POPPIES
FINAL JUDGEMENT
FOXTON LOCK
FRAGILE TRUCE
LACRIMAE Composed by Jan Stoeckart
MISSING LN ACTION
MISTS OF TIME
NEW PEER GYNT SUITE NO. 1 OP. 46 Composed by Edvard Grieg
NIGHT RAGA
PAST MYSTERIES
PIANO CONCERTO LN A MINOR OP. 16 Composed by Edvard Grieg
RIVER SUNRISE
SUMMERLDYLL
SYMPHONY NO. 9 FROM THE NEW WORLD Composed by Antonín Dvořák
SYMPHONY NO. 5 Composed by Gustav Mahler
TRAGEDY
YERUSHOLAYIM

Gods & Kings
The Civilization V expansion, Gods & Kings, includes the soundtrack within the game files.

1. Opening Movie Music

2. Gods & Kings Theme, based on Te Deum

3, 4. Gustavus Adolphus – Sweden – "Du Gamla, Du Fria"

5, 6. Boudicca – The Celts – "Lord Gregory, The Lass of Aughrim"

7, 8. William of Orange – The Netherlands – "In Naam van Oranje"

9, 10. Maria Theresa – Austria – "Requiem Mass" in D minor; "Still Still Still"

11, 12. Attila – The Huns – "Li Ling Si Han"

13, 14. Dido – Carthage – "Hymn to Nikkal"

15, 16. Theodora – Byzantium – "Phos Hilaron"

17, 18. Haile Selassie – Ethiopia – "Traditional melody"; Selassie's National Anthem

19, 20. Pacal – The Maya – "Traditional melody fragments"

21. Fall of Rome

22. The Medieval World – "Messe de Notre Dame"

23. Smoky Skies

Brave New World
The second Civilization V expansion, Brave New World, contains the following original music:

 Civilization V: Brave New World – Opening Movie Music
 Civilization V: Brave New World Theme – Opening Menu Music (lyrics based on the Latin text of chapter 21 of the Book of Revelation as found in the Vulgate)
 Assyria – Ashurbanipal – "Ancient Assyrian Chant"
 Indonesia – Gajah Mada – "Udan Mas"
 Brazil – Pedro II – "Chega de Saudade"
 Poland – Casimir – "Bóg się rodzi"
 Portugal – Maria I – "Saudades de Coimbra"
 Morocco – Ahmad Al-Mansur – "Mawal Gnawi"
 Shoshone – Pocatello – "Shoshone Sun Dance Songs"
 Venice – Enrico Dandolo – "Rotta Ò Sonata"
 Zulu – Shaka – "Inhliziyo Yami"
 Scramble for Africa Scenario – "Ujuba na takaburi"
 The Civil War (this song came bundled with the Gods and Kings expansion as well, but was not used in the game)
 Conquest of the New World – Orchestral Version

Civilization: Beyond Earth
The soundtrack for "Civilization: Beyond Earth" was composed entirely by Geoff Knorr, Michael Curran, Griffin Cohen and Grant Kirkhope. The soundtrack was critically acclaimed and won the 2014 IFMCA Best Original Score for a Video Game or Interactive Media, in addition to many other accolades.

Music in Civilization: Beyond Earth includes:

 The Seeding – (trailer theme) – Geoff Knorr
 Beyond Earth – (menu theme) – Geoff Knorr
 The Lush Planet – Geoff Knorr
 The Lush Planet - Ambient Early – Griffin Cohen
 Beauty in the Eye of the Orbiter – Geoff Knorr
 Destroyer – Geoff Knorr
 The Lush Planet – Ambient Middle—Griffin Cohen
 Lux Perpetua – Geoff Knorr
 Benedicite – Geoff Knorr
 The Lush Planet – Ambient Late—Griffin Cohen
 Our New World – Geoff Knorr
 The Fungal Planet – Geoff Knorr
 The Fungal Planet – Ambient Early—Griffin Cohen
 Acclimation – Geoff Knorr
 Promethean – Geoff Knor
 The Fungal Planet – Ambient Middle – Griffin Cohen
 Xenomalleum – Geoff Knorr
 The Fungal Planet – Ambient Late – Griffin Cohen
 A New Beginning – Geoff Knorr
 The Arid Planet – Michael Curran
 The Arid Planet – Ambient Early—Griffin Cohen
 Solar Collector – Grant Krikhope
 Dogmatic Engineering – Grant Kirkhope
 The Arid Planet – Ambient Middle – Griffin Cohen
 Xeno Titan – Grant Kirkhope
 The Signal – Grant Kirkhope
 The Arid Planet – Ambient Late—Griffin Cohen
 Deep Memory – Grant Kirkhope
 Planetfall – Michael Curran
 Planetfall – Ambient Early 1 – Griffin Cohen
 Alien Shores – Michael Curran
 Sky Mine – Michael Curran
 Planetfall – Ambient Early 2 – Griffin Cohen
 Earth's Ambassadors – Michael Curran
 O Muse – Michael Curran
 Planetfall – Ambient Middle – Griffin Cohen
 Deep Space – Michael Curran
 Planetfall – Ambient Late 1 – Griffin Cohen
 Xenomancer – Michael Curran
 Planetfall – Ambient Late 2 – Griffin Cohen
 Solid State Citizen – Griffin Cohen
 The Future of Mankind – Geoff Knorr

Rising Tide
Reunited – Geoff Knorr – 2:14
Rising Tide – Geoff Knorr – 4:56
The Abyss – Geoff Knorr – 3:10
The Abyss – Ambient Early – Griffin Cohen Geoff Knorr – 4:54
Upon the Expanse – Geoff Knorr – 4:05
Ebb and Flow – Geoff Knorr – 4:06
The Abyss – Ambient Middle – Griffin Cohen – 4:03
Dive – Geoff Knorr – 3:56
Tide Hunter – Geoff Knorr – 3:31
The Abyss – Ambient Late – Griffin Cohen – 3:52
Neptune's Glory – Geoff Knorr – 5:00
The Old World – Griffin Cohen – 3:13
The Old World – Ambient Early – Griffin Cohen – 4:36
Holocene – Grant Kirkhope – 4:19
Terra Incognita – Grant Kirkhope – 4:49
The Old World – Ambient Middle – Griffin Cohen – 3:57
Ice and Conquest – Grant Kirkhope – 4:59
The Dendrite Frontier – Grant Kirkhope – 5:15
The Old World – Ambient Late – Griffin Cohen – 4:13
Fractal Aquilon – Grant Kirkhope – 4:21
The Young World – Geoff Knorr – 3:21
The Young World – Ambient Early – Griffin Cohen – 3:36
Immortal – Geoff Knorr – 5:18
Mobius Horn – Geoff Knorr – 3:32
The Young World – Ambient Middle – Griffin Cohen – 3:27
Lahar – Geoff Knorr – 5:27
Primordial Majesty – Geoff Knorr – 5:08
The Young World – Ambient Late – Griffin Cohen – 3:55
Hybrid Champion – Geoff Knorr – 5:52

Civilization VI
Christopher Tin again wrote Civilization VIs main theme, "Sogno di Volare" (translated as "The Dream of Flight"). The theme was written to capture the spirit of exploration not only in "seeking new lands, but also the mental exploration of expanding the frontiers of science and philosophy". Tin premiered the song at a London concert in July 2016. The game's original score was written and orchestrated primarily by Geoff Knorr, who was assisted by Roland Rizzo and Phill Boucher. The themes of each civilization are played as different variations of the same song throughout the eras. In every playable civilization, simple single instrument melodies in the Ancient era turn into orchestral versions of the same melodies in later eras, symbolizing the evolution and growth of one's civilization throughout the ages. The score was nominated for 2016 Music of the Year by the Game Audio Network Guild.

Each civilization has its own main theme which evolves as the player progresses throughout the eras. Each theme has four versions, each musically corresponding to one of the following eras: Ancient, Medieval, Industrial and Atomic. The eras without an era-specific version will feature the most recent one. For example, the Classical era features the theme of the Ancient era, and the Renaissance era features the theme of the Medieval era.

Every civilization excluding Sumeria also feature specific "ambient" themes that play during the Ancient, Classical, Medieval, and Renaissance eras.

During a game session, the themes (main and ambient) of each participating civilization (including eliminated ones) will be featured in the in-game music. The versions correspond to the current era of each civilization.

Base game and minor DLCs 
The main theme of each civilization is written in bold.
America - Hard Times Come Again No More, Arkansas Traveler, New Five Cent Piece, Sally in the Garden, Valley Forge
Arabia - Banat Iskandaria, Kawala and Sufi improvisation, Qanun improvisation
Australia - Waltzing Matilda, Click Go the Shears, Billy of Tea, Ryebuck Shearer, The Overlander, With My Swag On My Shoulder, Didgeridoo improvisation (DLC)
Aztec - Traditional nahua music, Flute improvisation, Hand drum and wood drum improvisation
Brazil - Brejeiro, Tico-Tico no Fubá, Branca, Tardes Em Lindoia, Terna Saudade
China - Mo Li Hua, Guzheng improvisation, Fisherman's Song at Dusk, High Mountain Flowing Water, Lotus Above Water, Rain, Winter Flower
Egypt - El Helwa Di, Ney, Sufi, and Oud improvisation
England - Scarborough Fair, Bonny Boy, Green Bushes, Greensleeves, The Bold Grenadier, High Germany, Lovely Joan
France - Tourdion - Quand je bois du vin clairet, Douce Dame Jolie, Quand Je Suis Mis Au Retour, Ce fut en mai, Trouvère and Flute improv
Germany - Ich hab die Nacht geträumet, Wenn ich ein Vöglein wär, Ein Jäger aus Kurpfalz, In Stiller Nacht, Mayenzeit one Neidt, Schwesterlein, Spinn Spinn,
Greece - Song of Seikilos, Hymn to Helios, Lament of Ajax the Great, various ancient Greek music melody fragments
India - Vaishnava Jana To, Bansuri and Tabla improvisation
Indonesia - Bapang Selisir, Rejang Dewa, Udan Mas, Lenker (DLC)
Japan - Lullaby of Itsuki, Beauty of Nature, Moon Over The Deserted Castle, Shaku improvisation
Khmer - Khmer Rourm Sam Mawgee, Flower World, Kolon Kolkret, Lao Lik, Pri Prhn, Kawnsaing Snai (DLC)
Kongo - Banaha, Mama Munu Dile, Salampasu, percussion improvisation
Macedon - Tino Mori, Berance, Jano Mori, Duduk improvisation (DLC)
Norway - Gjendines Bådnlåt, Bansul etter Beate, Fairy Tale Girl, Prillarguri Fra Land, Seljefløyte and Bukkehorn improvisation
Nubia - Allah Musau, Zafa, Salaam Ya, drums improvisation (DLC)
Persia - Kereshmeh and Reng-e Shalakhu, Tonbak and Santur improvisation (DLC)
Poland - Hej idę w las, Polka music, Czerwienne, clarinet folk dance (DLC)
Rome - Magna Mater, Mare Nostrum, Aulos, Brass, Flute, and Lute improvisation
Russia - Kalinka, Tonkaja Rjabina, Bright Shines the Moon, Going Home, Balalaika improvisation
Scythia - Original Melody, Duduk improvisation
Spain - Recuerdos de la Alhambra, Romance Anonimo, Romance de Amour, Guitar improvisation
Sumeria - Hurrian Hymn to Nikkal

Rise and Fall
The first Civilization VI expansion, Rise and Fall, contains the following original music:

Cree - Round Dance Song from The Drums of Poundmaker, Cut Knife Hill, Hand drum improvisation
Georgia - Shen Khar Venakhi (Thou Art a Vineyard), Tsaiqvanes Tamar Kali, Didavoi Nana, Khinstskala, Kuchkhi Bedineri, Lazhghvash, Shairebi, Tsminda Ninos, Utsinares Mas
Korea - Arirang, Doraji, Buk and Janggu improvisation, Milyang Arirang, drum ensembles improvisation
Mapuche - Traditional Mapuche music, Flute, Kunkulkawe, and Brass improvisation
Mongolia - Ukhert Khuiten Khoyor, Urtiin Duu, Jalam Har, Topshur, Morin Khuur, and Khoomi improvisation
Netherlands - Merck Toch Hoe Sterck, Gaillarde e L'esmerillone, Canary dance, Domine ne menimeris, Adjuva Nos, Vox in Rama, Dies sind die heilgen zehn Gebot
Scotland - Scotland the Brave, Bonnie Dundee, Cock o' the North, Chì mi na mòrbheanna, Hector the Hero, MacCrimmon's Sweetheart, Believe Me, My Longings, Snare improvisation, When the Battle is O'er
Zulu - Uthe Ubhuti Asizomlanda, Halala, Bayisa, Shaka Mamba, Aniboyizobekha, Thula Baba Clapping, Ululation, and Sangoma Drum improvisation

Gathering Storm

Canada - Vive la Canadienne, Crooked Stove Pipe, O Canada, À la claire fontaine, Ave Maris Stella, Come All Ye Bold Canadians, Farewell to Nova Scotia
Hungary - Hej Dunáról fúj a szél, Cinege cinege, Apor Lázár tánca, Még azt mondják nem ilik, Hajdú tánc, Házasodik a Tücsök, Két Szál Pünkösdrózsa, Szatmári verbunk
Inca - Siempre Macho, Carnaval de Tambobama, Corazoncito, Piquicha, Sikuri, Shakers and drums improvisation
Mali - Mali Sadio, Masana Seesay, Alla Lakay, Bani, Concoba, Jawara, Jeili Foli Lomba, Kalefa, Sunjata, Pentatonic improvisation
Maori - Pokarekare Ana, Ka Mate, Hine E Hine, Me He Manu Rere, Paikea, Tika Tonu Haka
Ottomans - Yelkenler Biçilecek, Ey büt-i nev edâ olmuşum müptelâ, Ceddin Deden, Hicaz Hümâyun Peşrevi, Nice Bir, Nikriz Peşrevi, Rast Nakış Beste
Phoenicia - Hurrian Hymn to Nikkal n°6 (Phoenician version), numerous variations of the same theme with different instruments including the duduk.
Sweden - Slängpolska efter Byss-Calle, Helan Går, Polska efter Pelle Fors, Du gamla, du fria, Herr Holger, Herr Mannelig, Ridmarsch efter Byss-Calle

New Frontier Pass
Maya - Xtoles, Bolonchon, Rabinal Achi, Entrada Gueguechos, Baile del Venado, Mayan trumpets, ocarina and percussions improvisations. (A similar melody can be heard in the third movement of La noche de los mayas by Silvestre Revueltas.)
Gran Colombia - Velo que Bonito, Reir Llorando, Pajarillo, Currulao, Indios Farotos, Cumbia, Joropo Pajarillo
Ethiopia - Tizita, Bati, Tizita minor, Ambassel, Anchihoye Lene
Byzantium - Ti Ipermaho, Kontakion of the Mother of God, Phos Hilaron, Justinian's Hymn,Ton Despotin, Polychronion of the Basileus
Gaul - La Brabançonne, Original Melody, drum solo and metal drums, lyre improvisations
Babylon - Original Melody, gold lyre of Ur, ney and percussions improvisations
Vietnam - Trống Cơm, Lý kéo chài, Lý giăng câu, Lưu Thuỷ Hành Vân,  Lưu Thủy, Kim Tiền, Xuân Phong, Long Hổ, Lý Tình Tang, Tứ Đại Oán, Bèo Dạt Mây Trôi
Portugal - Fado menor, Fado Corrido, Fado Hilario, Fado Mouraria, Ceifeira, Malhao Velho

References

External links
Lyrics to Baba Yetu
Lyrics to the Gods & Kings Theme

Music In
Music by video game franchise